Paul Lewis Hancock, (26 March 1937, London - 9 December 1998, Bristol) was a British geologist and editor of Journal of Structural Geology (Editor-in-Chief, 1979-1985; Founding Editor, 1986-1998).

Early life and education 
Paul Lewis Hancock born in London 26 March 1937. He graduated from Sheen Grammar School and later Durham University.

Career
His professional career started as lecturer in geology at Nottingham Trent Polytechnic 1964 then Strathclyde Polytechnic 1966-1969 Bristol University (1969–81), reader (1981–95) and professor of Neotectonics (1995–98).

In 1978, he conceived the Journal of Structural Geology with the Peter Henn at Pergamon Press. From 1979-1985, he was Editor-in-Chief and in 1986-1998 Founding Editor of the Magazine.

In 1986 he moved to northeastern Zimbabwe, where he lived for the rest of his life.

Hancock died of bone cancer at his home in Zimbabwe on 9 December 1998.

Personal life 
Hancock was married twice Janet Hancock Died 03/2017(1964-1988) Anne Hancock Died 07/2017 (1993-) and had a son Nigel Hancock(1965) and a daughter Ruth Hancock(1968).

References

Bibliography
 Paul L. Hancock (ed.)  Continental deformation. - Publisher:Oxford, New York: Pergamon Press. - 1994. - 421 p. - 

1937 births
1998 deaths
British emigrants to Zimbabwe
Alumni of University College, Durham
20th-century British geologists
Scientists from London